Luc Bürgin (born 19 August 1970 in Basel) is a Swiss writer, publicist, and journalist. From 1996 to 2002, Bürgin studied German literature, folklore, musicology, media studies and sociology at the University of Basel. He has served as a journalist for Basler Zeitung Medien and as editor in chief of Baslerstab. He is best known for his writings on fringe science and popular science.

Der Urzeit-Code 
Published in 2007, Bürgin's book Der Urzeit-Code (The Primeval Code), is a popular science book dealing with a patent granted in 1980 to the chemical company Ciba-Geigy (now Novartis), which deals with the process of electroculture, which helped to increase the resilience of crops and reduce the use of pesticides on treated crops. The book details reports and interviews that document the effect of the electroculture process which had not been previously explained scientifically. In the book, Bürgin presents electroculture as a more ecologically-friendly alternative to genetic engineering.

Works 
 Chinas mysteriöses Höhlenlabyrinth: Die unterirdische Welt von Huangshan. Kopp, Rottenburg 2013, .
 Mystery: Neue Beweise für das Unerklärliche. Kopp, Rottenburg 2012, .
 Lexikon der verbotenen Archäologie: Mysteriöse Relikte von A bis Z. Kopp, Rottenburg 2009, .
 Der Urzeit-Code: Die ökologische Alternative zur umstrittenen Gen-Technologie. Herbig, Luc Bürgin München 2007, .
 Psst… streng vertraulich: Brisante Enthüllungen, die man Ihnen verheimlichen wollte. Kopp, Rottenburg 2006, .
 Das Wunder Mirin Dajo: Der unverletzbare Prophet und seine paranormalen Kräfte. Kopp, Rottenburg 2004, .
 Hochtechnologie im Altertum: Flüsternde Steine, magische Spiegel, ewiges Licht. Kopp, Rottenburg 2003, .
 Rätsel der Archäologie: Unerwartete Entdeckungen, unerforschte Monumente. Herbig, München 2003, .
 UFOs über der Schweiz: Das Dossier der Luftwaffe. Kopp, Rottenburg 1999, .
 Geheimakte Archäologie: Unterdrückte Entdeckungen, verschollene Schätze, bizarre Funde. Bettendorf, München 1998, .
 Irrtümer der Wissenschaft: Verkannte Genies, Erfinderpech und kapitale Fehlurteile. Herbig, München 1997, .
 Mondblitze: Unterdrückte Entdeckungen in Raumfahrt und Wissenschaft. Herbig, München 1994, .
 Götterspuren: Der neue UFO-Report. Herbig, München 1993, .
 Chinas mysteriöses Höhlenlabyrinth: Die unterirdische Welt von Huangshan, Kopp, Rottenburg 2013,

External links 
 
 
 Autor und Werke
 www.mysteries-magazin.com
 www.urzeit-code.com

References 

1. https://web.archive.org/web/20121105104612/http://tatjana.ingold.ch/index.php?id=goetterspuren

2. http://literaturtest.net/text/buch/rezensio/b/buergin.html

3. Commercial Register: Dr. A. Hedri Foundation for Exopsychology and Epipsychology.

4. http://www.easymonitoring.ch/handelsregister/dr-a-hedri-stiftung-fuer-exopsychologie-und-epipsychologie-275592 Easymonitoring AG, 23 June 2003, accessed on 2 February 2014 .

Living people
1970 births
Swiss writers
Writers from Basel-Stadt
Pseudohistorians
Pseudoarchaeologists
Ufologists
Ancient astronauts proponents